Azim (ʿAẓīm ) is one of the names of Allah in Islam, meaning "Great" or "Magnificent" or "Protector" Also used as a personal name, as short form of the Abdolazim, Abdul Azim, "Servant of the Magnificent". It is used by many Sahrawi people as a surname originating from the Hassaniya Arabic.

Notable people with the name include:

Given name:
 Abdel Azim Ashry (1911-1997), Egyptian basketball player
 Azim Hussein, Indo-Fijian educationalist and politician
 Tariq Azim Khan, Pakistani politician
 Azim Nanji, Kenyan-born professor of Islamic studies
 Azim Premji (born 1945), Indian business tycoon
 Seyid Azim Shirvani (1835-1888), Azerbaijani poet

Surname:
 Hazem Abdel-Azim (born 1960), Egyptian government opponent, senior adviser to the telecommunications minister in 2007
 Essam Abdel-Azim (born 1970), football footballer of Egypt national football team
 Abdul Azim Al-Aliwat (born 1967), Saudi Arabian athlete, competed in the men's javelin throw at the 1988 Summer Olympics

See also
 Azim, Western Saraha, a village in Sahrawi Controlled Western Sahara, Sahrawi Arab Democratic Republic
 Azamat
 Ashkenazim

Arabic-language surnames
Arabic masculine given names
Names of God in Islam